This article lists fixed-wing aircraft with a stall speed of  or less, and certain other aircraft. It does not list helicopters or vertical take-off and landing aircraft.

Fixed-wing aircraft are limited by their stall speed, the slowest airspeed at which they can maintain level flight. This depends on weight, however an aircraft will typically have a published stall speed at maximum takeoff weight.

Short take-off and landing aircraft typically have a low stall speed.

Slowest aircraft

The Antonov An-2 had no published stall speed. At low speeds its elevator cannot generate enough downforce to exceed the stalling angle of attack. In practice it could maintain approximately  without descending.

The slowest jet-powered aircraft is the PZL M-15 Belphegor, with a stall speed of

References

Aviation records
Airspeed
Lists of technological superlatives